Durrell is a surname, and may refer to

Members of the Durrell family
 Gerald Durrell
 Jacquie Durrell
 Lawrence Durrell 
 Lawrence Samuel Durrell
 Lee McGeorge Durrell
 Louisa Dixie Durrell
 Margaret Durrell
 Leslie Durrell
 Shame Durrell

Others
 Dick Durrell
 Jim Durrell
 Martin Durrell
 Michael Durrell

See also
 Durrell Wildlife Conservation Trust